Abortion in Washington may refer to:

 Abortion in Washington (state)
 Abortion in Washington, D.C.